Jason Ong Khan Lee is a Malaysian politician from PKR. He was the Member of Penang State Legislative Assembly for Kebun Bunga from 2008 to 2013 and since 2018 after winning it in the 2008 Penang state election and 2018 Penang state election.

Election results

References 

People's Justice Party (Malaysia) politicians
Malaysian people of Chinese descent
Members of the Penang State Legislative Assembly
Year of birth missing (living people)
Living people